Poslovna Cona Žeje pri Komendi (literally, the "Žeje pri Komendi Industrial Zone") is an uninhabited settlement in the Municipality of Komenda in northern Slovenia. Until 2012, the area was part of the settlement of Žeje pri Komendi. The settlement is part of the traditional region of Upper Carniola and is included in the Central Slovenia Statistical Region.

References

External links

Poslovna Cona Žeje pri Komendi on Geopedia

Municipality of Komenda
2012 establishments in Slovenia